Roger William Bede Vaughan (9 January 1834 – 18 August 1883) was an English Benedictine monk of Downside Abbey and the second Roman Catholic Archbishop of Sydney, Australia from 1877 to 1883.

Biography

Early life 
Vaughan was born near Ross-on-Wye, Herefordshire, in 1834, one of 14 children. His father, lieutenant John Francis Vaughan, belonged to one of the oldest recusant families of Welsh descent in England. His mother was Elizabeth Louise Rolls, a convert. His brother was Cardinal Herbert Vaughan. All his siblings, save three, entered church ministry.

Vaughan was probably afflicted with congenital heart disease. At the age of six he was sent to a boarding school in Monmouth for three years, but his health proved to be delicate and for some years he was privately tutored at home. At age seven he was sent briefly to a local school, but his mother worried over his health and he was educated at home in a religious atmosphere. In September 1851 he was sent to the Benedictine St Gregory's College at Downside, Somerset. His mother's death in 1853 prompted serious thoughts of a religious vocation and on 12 September 1853 he took the Benedictine habit and the religious name Bede.

In 1855, at his father's request and expense, Vaughan was sent to Rome for further study under the guidance of the Italian scholar and reformer Angelo Zelli-Jacobuzzi. When Edward VIII visited Rome, the young monk served as his cicerone. He remained there for four years, living at the monastery of St. Paul Outside the Walls. He was ordained to the priesthood by Cardinal Patrizi in the basilica of St. John Lateran on 9 April 1859.

Priesthood 
He returned to Downside in August of the same year and in 1861 was appointed professor of metaphysics and moral philosophy at St. Michael's, Belmont, Herefordshire. A year later he was elected prior of the diocesan chapter of Newport and Menevia, and superior of Belmont and held these roles for over a decade.

He contributed to leading reviews and published his most important literary work, his Life of St Thomas of Aquin, in 1872. In 1865 he met Archbishop Polding, who several times asked Vaughan to be coadjutor bishop, and in 5 February 1873, Vaughan agreed and was appointed coadjutor of Sydney and titular bishop of Nazianzus. Cardinal Henry Manning consecrated Vaughn to the episcopate in March of that same year at Liverpool.

Coadjutor Bishop of Sydney 
Vaughan arrived at Sydney on 16 December 1873 and immediately devoted himself to two important movements: the provision of education for Catholic children and the rebuilding of St Mary's Cathedral which had been damaged by a previous fire.

From 1874 onward, Vaughan also served as rector of St John's College.

In 1876, he came into conflict with the Freemasons in connection with an address delivered on 9 October titled Hidden Springs which accused the Freemasons of a conspiracy to subvert religion and take over the education system.

Archbishop of Sydney 
He became Archbishop of Sydney on the death of Archbishop Polding, on 16 March 1877. In 1880 Henry Parkes passed an education act under which government aid to denominational education ceased at the end of 1882. Vaughan urged Catholics to work against this law.

He initiated moves towards the foundation of St. Patrick's Seminary, Manly, construction of which started soon after his death.

Vaughan experienced resistance from the largely Irish Catholic junior hierarchy and priesthood in Australia, who supported a church based on the devotional, penitential and authoritarian model envisioned by Irish Cardinal Paul Cullen. Despite the stated policies of the Catholic Emancipation Act of 1829, the largely Irish formed Maynooth Seminary clergy were educated to understand that the refined English Catholic bishops in  sectarian and atavistic terms. They also felt strongly that the form of church advocated by the Benedictines was less suited to the majority of Irish Catholic adherents than the Cullenist form.

The harsh eighteenth century Penal Laws of the British and Anglo-Irish Ascendency era Irish Parliaments and the on and off sectarian religious struggles since the Act of Supremacy had bred deep resentment between some of the Irish and English settlers. The consequences of the dissolution of monasteries during the Reformation had left Vaughan deeply committed to the primary vision of restoring monasticism in English speaking lands such as this new church in Australia.

This was not a vision the authors of the revived authoritarian devotional form of Catholicism in Ireland foresaw for the Irish Catholic diaspora in Australia, New Zealand or North America. Ireland had managed to preserve a number of pre-Reformation monastic foundations as well as found the Irish College in Rome. This was an ideological battle Vaughan fought through his episcopate, the outcome of which would not be largely determined until his successor Cardinal Patrick Francis Moran, a nephew of Paul Cullen and avid devotee of his vision, was appointed.

Death 
Vaughan left Sydney for the last time on 19 April 1883, intending to return to Rome. He arrived at Liverpool and died nearby at Ince Blundell Hall, the seat of his Weld-Blundell relations, on 18 August, where he was buried in the family vault. His remains were translated to Belmont in 1887 and reburied in the crypt of St Mary's Cathedral in August 1946. Vaughan left the residue of his estate, valued for probate at £61,828, to his successor.

References

External links
Roger William Vaughan on the online Australian Dictionary of Biography

 Roger William Bede Vaughan on Catholic Hierarchy.org

1834 births
1883 deaths
People from Ross-on-Wye
English Benedictines
Benedictine priors
English Roman Catholic missionaries
Benedictine bishops
19th-century Roman Catholic archbishops in Australia
English Roman Catholic priests
Roman Catholic archbishops of Sydney
British emigrants to Australia
Burials at St Mary's Cathedral, Sydney
Roman Catholic missionaries in Australia